Trigonictis is an extinct genus of mustelid related to the living grison. It lived in North America  during the Pliocene to Pleistocene.  Fossil specimens have been found across the United States, from Washington and Oregon in the northwest to California and Florida in the south.

Two species are known; Trigonictis macrodon and Trigonictis cookii.

References

Prehistoric mustelids
Prehistoric mammals of North America
Pliocene mammals of North America
Pleistocene mammals of North America
Pleistocene extinctions